Back to Mine: Audio Bullys, compiled by electronic music duo Audio Bullys, is the fifteenth compilation album in the Back to Mine series published by Disco Mix Club.  The album features a new song by the duo entitled "All Burnt Out".

Background 
With respect to the album, Simon Franks stated that Divine Madness by Madness was what piqued his interest in the band, and that song "A Message to You, Rudy" was what prompted him to become interested in ska band The Specials, both of whose compositions appear on the album.

Critical reception 
Will Hodgkinson	of The Guardian states that "Franks' rough voice, the laddish lyrics and the music's club-drenched style make the Audio Bullys seem quite tough", with Oldies.com stating that "Franks adopts a vocal style somewhere between speech and song, but the music, geared by Dinsdale’s sensibilities as a DJ, is propelled towards the dancefloor" going on to further describe the album as being "typically diverse".  Marisa Brown of Rovi Corporation goes on to describe the album as a "particularly rock heavy set".

Rowan Shaeffer of Counterculture however, stated that the duo was unable to combine the tunes into a cohesive mix, citing abrupt change in speed and style of music, with "Peaches" by The Stranglers being overpowered by "Out Of Space" by The Prodigy, and Marvin Gaye being swept up by debut song "All Burnt Out", a composition that impressed Shaeffer.

Track listing 
 My Girl  
 Renegade Master  
 Diamond Rings  
 Who's That Bad Man?  
 Peaches  
 Out of Space  
 Golden Brown  
 Strange Behaviour  
 Blank Expression  
 Dub War  
 All Day and All of the Night  
 Up the Junction  
 Live Your Life With Me  
 Find the Path (In Your Mind)  
 What You Won't Do for Love  
 Mercy Mercy Me (The Ecology)  
 All Burnt Out  
 God Only Knows

Personnel 
C. Miller - Composer
M. Smith - Composer
Glenn Tilbrook - Composer
Alan Winstanley - Producer
Hugh Cornwell - Composer
Liam Howlett - Composer, Mixing, Producer
Basement Jaxx - Producer, Mixing
Kevin Thornton - Composer
DJ Pulse - Composer
Rodney Smith - Composer
Simon Ratcliffe - Composer
Alex Tepper - Producer, Mixing
Dee Patten - Arranger, Producer
Tony Asher - Composer
Audio Bullys - Composer, Producer, DJ, Liner Notes
Lord Gosh - Mixing
Wild Children - Composer
Jean Jacques Burnel - Composer
Hylton Smythe - Producer
John Wood - Producer
Clive Langer - Producer
Ray Davies - Composer
Mike Barson - Composer
Jet Black - Composer
Jerry Dammers - Composer
Chris Difford - Composer
Dave Greenfield - Composer
Alfons Kettner - Composer
Marvin Gaye - Composer, Producer
Jools Holland - Vocals
The Specials - Composer
Brian Wilson - Composer
Bobby Caldwell - Composer

References 

Audio Bullys albums
2003 compilation albums
Audio Bullys